The SSN(X) program, also known as the Next-Generation Attack Submarine program, is a United States Navy program to develop a class of nuclear attack submarines to succeed its  and  attack submarines. The SSN(X) program is still in the early stages of development and no official details have been released about its design or capabilities.

The SSN(X) program is expected to incorporate advanced technologies and capabilities to ensure that the new submarines will be able to meet the evolving challenges of the modern maritime environment. It is believed that the SSN(X) program will focus on improving stealth, sensor capabilities, and firepower to enable the new submarines to operate effectively in a variety of missions, including intelligence gathering, special operations, and anti-submarine warfare.

Along with the Columbia-class ballistic missile submarine, the SSN(X) program is seen as a critical component of the Navy's future submarine force and is expected to play a key role in maintaining the United States' naval superiority in the coming decades. Despite projected schedules, it is not yet clear when the SSN(X) program will be fully developed and deployed, but it is likely to be a major focus of the Navy's research and development efforts in the coming years.

History 
The United States Navy first publicly discussed the SSN(X) program in 2014, describing plans to complete analysis of the new design's needs by 2024 and to begin construction by 2034, with initial deployment in 2043 after the last of the planned s are put into service. Over the next several years, the Navy conducted studies and analyses to determine the capabilities and requirements for the new submarines.

The Navy's budget request for Fiscal Year 2022 included $98.0 million to continue research and development, including $29.8 million for general class development and $68.1 million for developing its nuclear propulsion. The related budget lines (0603570N and 0604850N) were included unchanged in the FY 2022 National Defense Authorization Act signed into law by President Joe Biden in December 2021.

The Navy's FY2023 budget requests included $237.0 million, including $143.9 million for general class development and $93.1 million for its nuclear propulsion. As in 2021, the requested budget lines were included unchanged in the FY 2023 NDAA signed into law by President Biden in December 2022.

Design 
Details about the design have not been publicly released and are likely to change because the project is still in development. The Navy described its goals in its FY2022 budget request:

Unlike the VIRGINIA Class Submarine, which was designed for multimission dominance in the littoral, SSN(X) will be designed for greater transit speed under increased stealth conditions in all ocean environments, and carry a larger inventory of weapons and diverse payloads. It will also be designed to retain multi-mission capability and sustained combat presence in denied waters, with a renewed priority in the antisubmarine warfare (ASW) mission against sophisticated threats in greater numbers.

An initial small team was formed to consult with industry and identify the threat environment and technologies the submarine will need to operate against in the 2050-plus timeframe. One area already identified is the need to integrate with off-board systems so future Virginia boats and the SSN(X) can employ networked, extremely long-ranged weapons. Targeting information might also come from another platform like a patrol aircraft or an unmanned aerial vehicle (UAV) launched from the submarine. Researchers have identified a quieter advanced propulsion system and the ability to control multiple unmanned underwater vehicles (UUVs) at once as key SSN(X) components. The future submarines will operate through the end of the 21st century, and potentially into the 22nd century. New propulsion technology, moving beyond the use of a rotating mechanical device to push the boat through the water, could come in the form a biomimetic propulsion system that would eliminate noise-generating moving parts like the drive shaft and the spinning blades of the propulsor.

The size of the SSN(X) has not yet been publicly disclosed as of early 2023, but according to a December 2022 revision of the CRS report, the Navy wants "the speed and payload the Navy’s fast and heavily armed Seawolf (SSN-21) class SSN design, the acoustic quietness and sensors of the Virginia-class design, and the operational availability and service life of the Columbia-class design." The report goes on to suggest that the design would likely be greater than the 7,800 tons of the Virginia class and possibly greater than the 9,138 tons of the Seawolf class.

Construction 
The United States has two yards capable of building nuclear-powered submarines: General Dynamics’ Electric Boat Division (GD/EB) of Groton, CT, and Quonset Point, RI, and Huntington Ingalls Industries’ Newport News Shipbuilding (HII/NNS), of Newport News, VA. The actual construction approach is currently undecided and may take one of two forms:

 Joint construction by the two yards, as done with the Virginia-class SSN and, with some modifications, the  SSBN. With this approach, each shipyard takes turns building key components and performing final construction, such that each boat is built in pieces at different yards and assembled at a single yard, that yard shifting back and forth. This allows for a low rate of production while ensuring that critical skills are maintained at both yards, which theoretically should help keep costs down.
This is more suitable for faster production rates.

Procurement 
A Congressional Budget Office report in November 2022 suggested that the Navy is looking at several alternatives for the number of boats purchased over the next 30 years. All would be a decrease from the 77 total boats planned for procurement between 2022 and 2051 in the December 2020 Plan. All three alternatives see construction of SSN(X) submarines beginning in 2034.

The CBO has disputed the Navy's cost estimates in multiple reports. In April 2021, the Navy and CBO disagreed somewhat on the costs of the new design but both expected much higher costs than the $2.8 billion for Virginia-class boats, with the Navy estimating $5.8 billion and the CBO estimating $6.2 billion. According to the November 2022 report, the Navy expected costs of $5.6 billion per boat over the 30-year period under all three alternatives, while the CBO expected $6.3 billion, $7.2 billion, and $6.2 billion, respectively.

See also 

 Cruiser Baseline
 CG(X)
 Constellation-class frigate (FFG(X))
 DDG(X)

References 

Proposed ships of the United States Navy
United States Navy